Explorer 39, also known as AD-C (Air Density experiment-C), was a NASA scientific satellite belonging to series Air Density. It was launched on 8 August 1968, join with Explorer 40, from Launch Complex 5 of the Vandenberg Air Force Base, through a Scout launch vehicle.

Spacecraft 
Explorer 39 was an inflatable sphere,  in diameter. It was orbited to make atmospheric density determinations. The satellite was successfully launched into a nearly polar, highly elliptical orbit. It was folded and carried into orbit, together with ejection and inflation equipment, as part of the payload of Explorer 40. Two density experiments were performed.

Launch 
Explorer 39 orbited the Earth once every 118.20 minutes, at an inclination of 80.60°.

Mission 
One involved the study of systematic density variation, and the other was concerned with nonsystematic density changes. The upper atmospheric densities were derived from sequential observations of the sphere by use of an attached 136.620-MHz radio tracking beacon and by optical tracking. The radio beacon ceased transmitting in June 1971. Since that time it has been necessary to rely solely on the Smithsonian Astrophysical Observatory (SAO) Baker-Nunn camera network for tracking. Explorer 39 has an expected orbital lifetime of 50 years.

Experiments

Nonsystematic Changes of Air Density 
This experiment was designed to determine nonsystematic upper atmospheric density changes. Density values near perigee were deduced from sequential observations of the spacecraft position using optical (Baker-Nunn camera network) and radio and/or radar tracking techniques. This experiment has determined reasonable density values, and it is capable of yielding long-term atmospheric density values, as Explorer 39 has an expected orbital lifetime of 50 years.

Systematic Changes of Air Density 

Decay 
Explorer 39 reentered the atmosphere on 22 June 1981.

See also 

 Explorer 19
 Explorer 24
 Explorer program

References

External links 
 Explorer Series Satellites Colorado State University
 Explorer 39  Smithsonian Institution

Spacecraft launched in 1968
Explorers Program
Balloon satellites